Hyun-woo, also spelled Hyeon-woo, is a Korean masculine given name. The meaning differs based on the hanja used to write each syllable of the name. There are 42 hanja with the reading "hyun" and 60 hanja with the reading "woo" on the South Korean government's official list of hanja which may be registered for use in given names. Hyun-woo has been a popular name for baby boys in South Korea for more than two decades, coming in third place in 1988 and fourth place in 1998. In 2008, a total of 1,943 baby boys were given this name, making it the third-most popular name that year.

People with this name include:

Entertainers
Lee Hyun-woo (born 1966) (born 1966), South Korean actor and singer
Ha Hyun-woo (born 1981), South Korean singer-songwriter
Ji Hyun-woo (born Joo Hyung-tae, 1984), South Korean actor and indie rock guitarist
Hyun Woo (born Kim Hyun-woo, 1985), South Korean actor
Lee Hyun-woo (born 1993) (born 1993), South Korean actor and singer

Sportspeople
Ryu Hyun-woo (born 1981), South Korean golfer
Lim Hyun-woo (born 1983), South Korean football midfielder
Nam Hyun-woo (born 1987), South Korean field hockey player
Kim Hyeon-woo (born 1988), South Korean wrestler
Kim Hyun-woo (born 1989), South Korean football midfielder
Joo Hyeon-woo (born 1990), South Korean football midfielder
Jo Hyeon-woo (born 1991), South Korean football goalkeeper

Fictional characters
Hyun-woo Kim, a protagonist from  anime

Other
Ryu Hyun-woo (diplomat), North Korean diplomat
Gong Hyeon-U (born 1959), Chinese diplomat of Korean descent

References

Korean masculine given names